Velezia rigida is a species of flowering plant in the family Caryophyllaceae. It is native to southern Europe. It is also present in northern California where it is an introduced species. It is an annual herb growing from a taproot and producing a hairy, glandular, branching green or purplish stem up to 40 centimeters tall. The linear leaves are up to 2 centimeters long. Solitary flowers occur in the leaf axils. Each flower has a very long, cylindrical, ribbed calyx of fused sepals forming the tubular throat of the flower, measuring at least a centimeter in length. At the top of the tube is the flower corolla which has five pink or purplish petals.

External links
Jepson Manual Treatment
USDA Plants Profile
Flora of North America
Photo gallery

Caryophyllaceae
Plants described in 1753
Taxa named by Carl Linnaeus